Events from the year 1624 in France.

Incumbents 
Monarch: Louis XIII

Events
 Winter – The Rhône and the vineyards of Languedoc freeze.
 January 2 – Disgrace of Nicolas Brûlart de Sillery and Pierre Brûlart, marquis de Sillery.
 January 6 – Étienne Ier d'Aligre becomes Keeper of the Seals of France.
 April 29 – Louis XIII appoints Cardinal Richelieu to the Conseil du Roi (Royal Council).
 May – Croquant rebellions in Quercy, suppressed on June 7 by Marshal de Thémines.
 June 10 – Treaty of Compiègne is signed between the Kingdom of France and the Dutch Republic.
 August 13 – Cardinal Richelieu is appointed by Louis XIII to be his chief minister, having intrigued against Charles de La Vieuville, Superintendent of Finances, arrested for corruption the previous day.
 October 3 – Étienne Ier d'Aligre becomes Grand Chancellor of France.
 October 21 – Edict of Saint-Germain-en-Laye establishes a Chamber of Justice for the investigation of financial abuse and embezzlement in government.
 November 26 – French troops under the Marquis de Ceuvre set out to occupy the forts of Valtellina.
 December 6–10 – Treaties with Venice and the Duke of Savoy over Valtellina.
 The Palace of Versailles is first built by Louis XIII, as a hunting lodge.
 The Parlement passes a decree forbidding criticism of Aristotle, on pain of death.
 Congregation of the Mission settles in the Collège des Bons Enfants in Paris.
 French colonial empire: Coastal trading settlements established in French Guiana and Senegal.

Births
 January 16 – Pierre Lambert de la Motte, bishop (died 1679)
 March 21 – François Roberday, baroque organist and composer (died 1680)
 March 31 – Antoine Pagi, ecclesiastical historian (died 1699)
 June 11 – Jean-Baptiste du Hamel, cleric and natural philosopher (died 1706)
 August 22 – Jean Regnault de Segrais, poet and novelist born (died 1701)
 August 25 – François de la Chaise, churchman (died 1709)
 October 30 – Paul Pellisson, historian (died 1693)
 November 3 – Jean II d'Estrées, noble (died 1707)
 November 28 – Angélique de Saint-Jean Arnauld d'Andilly, Jansenist nun (died 1684)
Unknown date
 Louise de Prie, royal governess (died 1709)
 1624 or 1625 – Gaspard Marsy, sculptor (died 1681)
 Gabriel Vendages de Malapeire, French aristocrat, parliamentarian and poet (died 1702)

Deaths
 July 31 – Henry II, Duke of Lorraine, "the Good" (born 1563)
 September 25 – Fronton du Duc, Jesuit theologian (born 1558)

See also

References

1620s in France